King's Norton and Northfield Urban District was a local government administrative district in north Worcestershire, England, from 1898 until 1911. Much of its area was afterwards absorbed into the neighbouring Borough of Birmingham, under the Greater Birmingham Scheme, and now constitutes most of the city's southern and southwestern suburban environs.

Creation

The District was originally created in 1894 as the King's Norton Rural District, under the Local Government Act 1894, and succeeded the former King's Norton Rural Sanitary District upon which its area was largely based.  It was later reconstituted as an urban district on 1 October 1898, by the Local Government Board Order, No. 38,127, and was accordingly renamed the King's Norton and Northfield Urban District. Both as a rural and an urban district it comprised only those civil parishes of the King's Norton Poor Law Union then wholly within the Administrative County of Worcester, namely the parishes of King's Norton, Northfield and Beoley.

Governance

Electoral Wards
The District was arranged into the following wards for the election of local councillors:

King's Norton Civil Parish
King's Norton Ward
Moseley (Moor Green) Ward
Moseley (Wake Green) Ward
King's Heath (East) Ward
King's Heath (West) Ward
Stirchley (North) Ward
Stirchley (South) Ward
Rednal and Rubery Ward
Wythall Ward

Northfield Civil Parish
Northfield Ward
Selly Oak (East) Ward
Selly Oak (West) Ward
Bartley Green Ward

Beoley Civil Parish
Beoley Ward

Committees
The District Council was organised into several committees with responsibility over a number of areas:

General Purpose Committee

Baths, Parks and Cemeteries Committee
When the committee was initially set up it was as the Cemeteries Committee, with a separate sub-committee that had specific responsibility for baths and parks.  However, from May 1898 onwards, the Baths & Parks Sub-Committee ceased to exist and the Cemeteries Committee assumed their duties, altering its title to reflect this change.

Building Committee

Education Committee
The committee was formed on 1 June 1903, and consisted of 40 members, of whom 28 were District Councillors.

Pensions Committee
The committee had distinct sub-committees for the following areas of the District: King's Norton & Stirchley, Moseley & King's Heath, Wythall & Beoley, Northfield, and Selly Oak.

Distress Committee
The Committee consisted of 25 members, of whom 12 were District Councillors, 8 were Guardians of the King's Norton Poor Law Union, and the remaining 5 were "persons experienced in the relief of distress".

Demography
According to the 1911 census the District had a population of 81,153, large enough to become a county borough.

Amenities and services
During its existence the District Council provided public amenities for its populace in the form of two cemeteries, two swimming baths, several parks and recreation grounds, and a handful of free libraries.  The council also ran a number of elementary schools, as well as being responsible for the local volunteer fire service:

District Cemeteries

Public Baths

Public Parks

Free Libraries
Proposals for the provision of Free Libraries in the District were first mooted in 1902, and following the adoption of the Libraries Acts the next year, a scheme to establish libraries throughout its area was set up.  Between 1905 and 1909 seven new libraries were built across the District, with the land being donated by local philanthropic businessmen and the building work funded through the benevolence of Dr Andrew Carnegie.
{| class="wikitable unsortable"
|-
! | Image
! style="width: 15em" | Name
! style="width: 8em" | Year of opening
! Details
|-
| align="center"|? || Bartley Green Free Library || align="center"|1905 ||
|-
| align="center"| || King's Heath Free Library || align="center"|1906 ||
|-
| align="center"|? || King's Norton Free Library || align="center"|1906 ||
|-
| align="center"| || Selly Oak Free Library || align="center"|1906 || Built on land in the High Street, given by Mr Thomas Gibbins Junior of the Birmingham Battery and Metal Company in Selly Oak, in 1903, the foundation stone was laid on 1 August 1905 by Councillor E. A. Olivieri. The construction work itself was paid for by the Carnegie Foundation, and, at a final cost of £3,000, the Library was officially opened by Mr Gibbins on 23 June 1906. The completed building comprised a Reading Room, Lending Department and Reference Department.
|-
| align="center"| || Northfield Free Library || align="center"|1906 || Situated in Church Road, Northfield, and costing £750 to build, this small Library first opened its doors in September 1906. The original building, however, was consumed by fire on 12 February 1914. Believed to be the work of an arsonist, local suffragettes were reputed to have been responsible as they were active in the area, and a note was found spiked on the railings outside bearing the words "Give Women the Vote" along with a small brown paper parcel containing a copy of The Great Scourge and How to End It by Miss Christabel Pankhurst, apparently inscribed "To start your new library."<ref>The note is also recorded as having a slightly different wording of "For the new library"; see Notes on the History of the Birmingham Public Libraries: 1861-1961 (Birmingham Public Libraries, Birmingham, 1962), p. 9.</ref>
|-
| align="center"| || Stirchley Free Library || align="center"|1907 || Located on Bournville Lane in Stirchley, the Library was built in 1907.  As well as donating the land itself, George Cadbury apparently contributed £3,000 towards the building cost, though much of the work also seems to have been paid for by the Carnegie Trust.
|-
| align="center"|? || Rednal Free Library || align="center"|1909 || Built in Leach Green Lane, Rednal, the Library's foundation stone was laid on 12 June 1909 by "P. Farrell Esq."  The memorial tablet declares that "The funds for the erection of this building were provided by Andrew Carnegie Esq. of Skibo Castle N.B. and the purchase money for the site was given by Messrs Edward and George Cadbury Junior".
|-
|}

Council Schools
Until the 1902 Education Act, elementary education within the District was provided through a combination of a number of voluntary schools established by religious organisations, such as the Church of England National Schools and the non-denominational British Schools, together with those schools built and maintained by the local School Boards for King's Norton and Beoley, who had been set up in the wake of the Elementary Education Act 1870.  Under the 1902 Act the Urban District Council was designated a Local Education Authority, and thereafter assumed the duties of the former King's Norton and Beoley School Boards, which were accordingly abolished, inheriting their existing school buildings, as well as being given the power to establish new elementary schools within the area.

Fire Service

Abolition

The Urban District was finally abolished in 1911 as part of the provisions of the Greater Birmingham Act'', when much of its area was incorporated into the County Borough of Birmingham, and thereby became associated with Warwickshire.  This included the greater part of the civil parish of King's Norton, with the exception of a substantial still largely rural area in the south-east of the parish, which afterwards constituted the new civil parish of Wythall, as well as a small part of Rednal in the far south-west, which was added to the civil parish of Cofton Hackett.  It also included most of Northfield civil parish, save for a little under 200 acres at its extreme north-western tip which was transferred to the civil parish of Illey,  then part of the Halesowen Rural District.  It did not, however, include Beoley civil parish, which remained in Worcestershire, and which, along with Wythall, initially formed a separate rural district temporarily administered by the Bromsgrove Rural District Council, until both became part of that district on 31 March 1912.

References

Notes

Bibliography

External links
Vision of Britain

History of Worcestershire
History of Birmingham, West Midlands
Local government in Worcestershire
Local government in Birmingham, West Midlands
Districts of England created by the Local Government Act 1894
Urban districts of England
1911 disestablishments in England